The commune of Makamba is a commune of Makamba Province in southern Burundi. The capital lies at Makamba. In 2007, DGHER electrified one rural village in the commune.

References

Communes of Burundi
Makamba Province